Aniseto Ofa He Moori Tuungafasi (born 19 April 1992) is New Zealand rugby union player who plays for the All Blacks as a prop.

Tuungafasi is well known for his ability to cover either side of the scrum and has started as both loosehead and tighthead prop for New Zealand during his international career. He was a member of New Zealand's squad for the 2019 Rugby World Cup.

Career

Early career
Tuungafasi made his provincial debut in 2012 in a match against Hawke's Bay and his strong performances during the season saw him named in the  squad for the 2013 Super Rugby season.

Tuungafasi represented New Zealand Under 20 in the 2012 IRB Junior World Championship in South Africa making 5 appearances and scoring 1 try.

On 29 May 2016 he was selected in the All Blacks squad for a three test series against Wales. Tuungafasi made his debut for New Zealand in the third test of the series, which was a 46-6 thrashing of Wales where Tuungafasi replaced Blues teammate Charlie Faumuina off the bench after 53 minutes. Tuungafasi was one of three forwards to debut against Wales that day, doing so alongside Elliot Dixon and Liam Squire. Tuungafasi made four more appearances for the All Blacks off the bench that year.

2017
Tuungafasi started for the Blues in a historic 22–16 win over the touring British & Irish Lions in 2017, becoming a regular player for the All Blacks off the bench after Faumuina's departure at the end of the Lions series. This saw Tuungafasi score his first try for the All Blacks in the record 57–0 win over South Africa in the 2017 Rugby Championship and make headlines for bone crushing tackles on Wallabies first five Bernard Foley and replacement lock Lukhan Tui in the third Bledisloe Cup test of 2017, but it was unfortunately lost 23-18 after Tuungafasi conceded a 3 point penalty to winger Reece Hodge for illegally taking out a Wallaby with three minutes left.

Tuungafasi made his first start for the All Blacks in the 31–22 win against the Barbarians on the 2017 end of year tour and was one of only two players to make an appearance for the All Blacks on every match of the end of year tour, alongside Lima Sopoaga.

2018
Tuungafasi became a regular starter for the Blues in the 2018 Super Rugby season, replacing the departed Charlie Faumuina as the first choice tighthead prop. During Super Rugby, Tuungafasi re signed to the New Zealand Rugby Union, with a deal lasting until 2021.

After the Blues had a disappointing Super Rugby season, Tuungafasi was retained by the All Blacks for the three test series against France in 2018. Tuungafasi was one of only three Blues players selected, alongside backs Rieko Ioane and Sonny Bill Williams. Tuungafasi replaced Owen Franks off the bench in all three tests against France, with his most notable involvement in the series being the second test, a 26–13 win over France on 16 June 2018. Tuungafasi replaced Franks in only the 34th minute, with Franks failing to scrummage to the referee's standards. Tuungafasi's shifts off the bench provided support to let the All Blacks win the series 3–0. He did also, however, cause controversy in the media for a head high tackle in the first test, with media deeming Tuungafasi and Sam Cane's combined tackle on French winger, Rémy Grosso, worthy of a red card, following a fracture to Grosso's face.

Tuungafasi earned a start at tighthead prop against Argentina, at Buenos Aires, during the 2018 Rugby Championship. The test, which took place on 29 September, was the first test start of Tuungafasi's international career. Tuungafasi was replaced by debutant, Angus Ta'avao, in the 51st minute, with the test ending in a 35–17 win, as well as New Zealand's third consecutive win of the competition.

On the 2018 end of season tour, Tuungafasi earned a start against Japan, being preferred over Tim Perry as the starting loosehead prop for the test. Tuungafasi was replaced by Perry after 54 minutes during the 69–31 victory and the following week, replaced Karl Tu'inukuafe, in New Zealand's narrow 16–15 win over England at Twickenham Stadium.

Having absolutely proved his ability to cover both loosehead and tighthead Prop, Tuungafasi was once again named by Steve Hansen, as the All Blacks' reserve loosehead Prop for their upcoming 17 November test, against World Rugby's number 2 ranked side, Ireland. Nepo Laulala was chosen as the reserve tighthead prop over Tuungafasi. The All Blacks went on to lose the test to Ireland, 9–16, replacing the whole front row in the 48th minute. After an average performance against Ireland, Tuungafasi finished the year off with a start against Italy, during a 66–3 win.

2019
Well established in the Blues, as well as the All Blacks setups, Tuungafasi played in four of New Zealand's five warm up tests prior to the World Cup, missing a record 26–47 defeat to Australia during the 2019 Rugby Championship, with rookie, Atu Moli, having earned a recall. Tuungafasi went on to replace Joe Moody off the bench in both the Bledisloe Cup winning 36–0 victory over Australia, as well as a 92–7 win over his native Tonga.

On 28 August, All Blacks Head Coach, Steve Hansen, named Tuungafasi as one of 31 players in New Zealand's squad for the 2019 Rugby World Cup.
 Tuungafasi and his father, Mofuike, joined the group of fathers and sons to play at a Rugby World Cup, including the likes of Wales' Ross Moriarty and France's Romain Ntamack, whose fathers had also previously appeared at World Cups.

Tuungafasi made five test appearances at the World Cup, including the 7–19 defeat to England during the semi-final.

2020 
Tuungafasi had a stellar season with the Blues in Super Rugby Aotearoa, earning him a starting place in all four Bledisloe Cup tests against the Wallabies at the end of the year. However, he was red carded in the fourth game for a high tackle on Wallabies debutant Tom Wright. Tuungafasi's shoulder came into contact with Wright's chin. Tuungafasi was banned for three weeks by SAANZAR, which meant that he could not feature for the rest of the international season. This incident, along with the red card to Wallabies debutant Lachlan Swinton, prompted much public debate over the red card rule and high tackle framework.

Personal life
Tuungafasi moved to New Zealand in 2006. He has ten brothers and two younger sisters. His father Mofuike, played as a lock and represented Tonga at the 1987 Rugby World Cup. One of his brothers, Isileli is also a professional rugby player and is Ofa's teammate at the Auckland provincial. Tuungafasi is married and is a father of three daughters. Tuungafasi converted to Islam in March 2019.

Notes

External links
 Blues player profile
 itsrugby.co.uk profile

1992 births
Living people
New Zealand rugby union players
New Zealand sportspeople of Tongan descent
Rugby union props
Blues (Super Rugby) players
Auckland rugby union players
Tongan emigrants to New Zealand
People from Nukuʻalofa
New Zealand Muslims
Tongan Muslims
Converts to Islam
New Zealand international rugby union players
Northland rugby union players